The phrase Christian soldier may refer to:
 Miles Christianus, a Christian allegory based on New Testament military metaphors.
 Christians in the military 
 Military order (society), one of a variety of Christian societies of knights.
 Church militant and church triumphant

See also
 Miles Christi (disambiguation)
 Holy war#Christianity
 New Testament military metaphors 
 Onward, Christian Soldiers 
 Soldiers of Christ, Arise